Dulia is a village in the Bas-Uélé province of the Democratic Republic of the Congo. It was a station on the defunct Vicicongo line, a railway.

Location

Dulia is in the Bas-Uélé province, Democratic Republic of the Congo, in the Avuru Gatanga chiefdom of Aketi Territory.
It is on the RN4 road between Buta to the east and Bondo to the northwest.
It is at the end of the RN6 road from Aketi to the southwest.
It is a few kilometers north of the Rubi River.

Facilities

Gold and diamond deposits have been reported in Dulia.
It has a large diamond quarry.

Dulia has a health center, and is in the Aketi health zone.

The main axis of the Vicicongo line built by the Société des Chemins de Fer Vicinaux du Congo ran east from ran from Aketi through Komba to Dulia, then through Kotili to Buta.

Notes

Sources

Populated places in Bas-Uélé